The John A. Mead Manufacturing Company was based at 9 Broadway in New York City and produced steam shovels for coal handling.

Products 
The company was founded by John A. Mead in the late 1890s and erected four movable steam shovel towers and a 4,200 feet (1280 m) long cable railroad at the plant of the New England Gas and Coke Company in Everett, Massachusetts.

Over 90 percent of all coal handling plants in Boston and vicinity used Mead Company cable railroad and automatic bucket systems. In New York City, the number of Mead shovels was double that of any other make.

The Mead Company equipped the following plants:

 E. L. Hedstrom & Co., Chicago: 2 movable towers, 9 automatic roads
 Geo. Lill Coal Co., Chicago: 2 movable towers, 9 automatic roads
 Standard Oil Company, New York: Steam shovel and steel pocket
 The Milwaukee Electric Railway and Light Company
 Metropolitan Street Railway, New York
 Curtis & Blaisdell, New York
 J. F. Schmadeke, Brooklyn

References 

Manufacturing companies based in New York (state)
Defunct rolling stock manufacturers of the United States